Arman Khachatryan (born 18 March 1977), is an Armenian actor, comedian, and showman. In 2005, Arman joined several other comedians—largely unknown to the public—to form 32 Teeth (32 ատամ) comedy show. In 2010 Arman and his friends created the Vitamin Club (Վիտամին ակումբ) stand-up comedy TV show, which was broadcast by Shant TV every week till 2016.

Filmography
Armush has appeared in the following movies:

 "Ala Bala Nica" (2011)
 "Showing of Love" (2015)

References

External links

Page on AV Production

1977 births
Living people
Male actors from Yerevan
Armenian male film actors